Duane Howard Doane (July 30, 1883 – February 19, 1984) was the founder and long-time Chairman of the Board of Doane Agricultural Services, which is the oldest, and for decades was the largest, farm management, appraisal and agricultural research organization in the United States.

Doane served on an agriculture task force appointed by President Herbert Hoover that was charged with reorganizing the United States Department of Agriculture.

He wrote four books and numerous articles for the leading agricultural journals and magazines. He provided leadership to dozens of civic and professional organizations throughout his lifetime. He received three Honorary doctorates.

Biography
He was born on July 30, 1883. He received a B.S. in Agriculture in 1908 and M.S. in Agriculture in 1909 at the University of Missouri where he was also the founding father of FarmHouse fraternity.

In 1948 he was appointed to a committee headed by Henry L. Stimson, and Harvey Hollister Bundy and James Grafton Rogers to study the foreign affairs activities of the Federal Government.

He died on February 19, 1984.

Bibliography
Sheep Feeding and Farm Management (1912)
County Farm Adviser Plan (1913)
Vertical Farm Diversification (1950)

References

External links

1883 births
1984 deaths
20th-century American writers
American centenarians
FarmHouse founders
Men centenarians
University of Missouri alumni
20th-century American male writers